Canterbury City Council is the local authority for the City of Canterbury. The council is elected every four years.

Political control
The first election to the council was held in 1973, initially operating as a shadow authority before coming into its powers on 1 April 1974. Political control of the council since 1973 has been held by the following parties:

Leadership
The role of lord mayor in Canterbury is largely ceremonial. From 1974 to 2002 political leadership was provided by the chair of the policy committee, and if that person's party had a majority of the seats on the council they would also take the title "leader of the council". The role of leader was made a formal appointment in 2002. The leaders (or chairs of the policy committee prior to 2002) have been:

Council elections
1973 Canterbury City Council election
1976 Canterbury City Council election
1979 Canterbury City Council election (New ward boundaries)
1983 Canterbury City Council election
1987 Canterbury City Council election (City boundary changes took place but the number of seats remained the same)
1991 Canterbury City Council election
1995 Canterbury City Council election
1999 Canterbury City Council election
2003 Canterbury City Council election (New ward boundaries)
2007 Canterbury City Council election
2011 Canterbury City Council election
2015 Canterbury City Council election (New ward boundaries)
2019 Canterbury City Council election

Result maps

By-election results

1995-1999

1999-2003

2003-2007

2007-2011

2011-2015

2015-2019

2019-2023

References

External links
 Canterbury Council

 
 
Council elections in Kent
District council elections in England